Herring Creek is a  long 3rd order tributary to Rehoboth Bay, in Sussex County, Delaware.

Course
Herring Creek is formed at the confluence of Burton Prong and Hopkins Prong, south of Angola Beach in Sussex County, Delaware.  Herring Creek then flows southeast to meet Rehoboth Bay at Angola Landing.

Watershed
Herring Creek drains  of area, receives about 45.0 in/year of precipitation, has a topographic wetness index of 638.39 and is about 23.7% forested.

See also
List of rivers of Delaware

References 

Rivers of Delaware